

History
The JMC Yusheng (江铃驭胜) is a sub-brand of Jiangling (JMC) for crossovers and SUVs since 2010. It is Jiangling's first entry into the crossover SUV market. With the launch of the Yusheng S350 mid-size SUV at the time of the brand launch, the Yusheng S350 was originally the JMC Yusheng, and it spawned the JMC Yuhu pickup with the same platform. The SUV was later renamed the S350 and the Yusheng became the brand. In 2016, the Yusheng S330 compact CUV was launched as Yusheng's second product.

Products
 Yusheng S330 compact CUV: A compact crossover SUV.
 Yusheng S350 mid-size SUV: A mid-size SUV based on the platform shared with the Ford Everest.

Gallery

References

External links

Official website of Jianling Motors
Official website of Yusheng brand
Official West African website of Jianling Motors

Car manufacturers of China
Companies based in Jiangxi
Chinese brands